Pezens is a commune in the Aude department in southern France.

Population

The inhabitants are known as Pezenois.

See also
Communes of the Aude department

References

Communes of Aude
Aude communes articles needing translation from French Wikipedia